This is a comprehensive list of Mustafa Kemal Atatürk's awards (1881 – 10 November 1938) who was a field marshal, revolutionary statesman, and founder of the Republic of Turkey as well as its first President.

Orders, decorations and medals

Ribbons, Lapel pins

References 
 Atatürk'ün Madalya ve Nişanları
 Atatürk'ün Rütbe, Nişan ve Madalyaları

Mustafa Kemal Atatürk
Ataturk